The Emerald network is a network of Areas of Special Conservation Interest to conserve wild flora and fauna and their natural habitats of Europe, which was launched in 1989 by the Council of Europe as part of its work under the Convention on the Conservation of European Wildlife and Natural Habitats or Bern Convention that came into force on 1 June 1982. It is to be set up in each Contracting Party or observer state to the convention.

The Bern Convention is signed by the 46 member states of the Council of Europe, together with the European Union, Monaco, Burkina Faso, Morocco, Tunisia and Senegal. Algeria, Belarus, Bosnia and Herzegovina, Cape Verde, Vatican City, San Marino and Russia are among non-signatories that have observer status at meetings of the committee.

The European Union, as such, is also a Contracting Party to the Bern Convention. In order to fulfil its obligations arising from the convention, particularly in respect of habitat protection, it produced the Habitats Directive in 1992 and subsequently set up the Natura 2000 network.

The development of the Emerald Network in Africa has started with the implementation of pilot projects in Burkina Faso, Senegal and Morocco (ongoing). The Emerald Network could also be launched in Tunisia, at the request of the national authorities.

See also 
Biogeographic regions of Europe
Ecological network

References 
 Emerald network of Areas of Special Conservation Interest
 EEA – Glossary – Emerald Network December, 2005.
 THE EMERALD NETWORK A tool for the protection of European natural habitats  [PDF]

External links 
A-Z of Areas of Biodiversity Importance: Emerald Network Sites

Council of Europe
European Union and the environment
Ecology organizations